Demaratus was a king of Sparta from around 515 BC to 491 BC. The 15th of the Eurypontid line, he was the first son born to his father, King Ariston.

As king, Demaratus is known chiefly for his opposition to the co-ruling Spartan king, Cleomenes I. He later fled to Achaemenid Persia, where he was given asylum and land, and fought on the Persian side during the Second Persian invasion of Greece.

Early life 
Demaratus, the son of King Ariston (r. c.550–c.515), belonged to the Eurypontid dynasty, one of the two royal families of Sparta (the other being the Agiads). After Ariston had remained childless from his first two wives, he took the wife of Agetus, one of his friends. Less than 10 months later, Demaratus was born, but Ariston rejected his paternity before the ephors. He nonetheless changed his mind later and recognised Demaratus as his son, who succeeded him at his death around 515.

Reign 
When Cleomenes attempted to make Isagoras tyrant in Athens, Demaratus tried to frustrate the plans. In 491 BC, Aegina was one of the states that gave the symbols of submission (earth and water) to Persia. Athens at once appealed to Sparta to punish that act of medism, and Cleomenes I crossed over to the island to arrest those responsible. His first attempt was unsuccessful because of interference from Demaratus, who did his utmost to bring Cleomenes into disfavour at home.

In retaliation, Cleomenes urged Leotychidas, a relative and personal enemy of Demaratus, to claim the throne on the grounds that the latter was really the son not of Ariston but of Agetus, his mother's first husband.  Cleomenes bribed the Delphic oracle to pronounce in favour of Leotychidas, who became king in 491 BC.

After the deposition of Demaratus, Cleomenes visited the island of Aegina for a second time. Accompanied by his new colleague, Leotychides, he seized ten of the leading citizens and deposited them at Athens as hostages.

Demaratus and Xerxes 

On his abdication, Demaratus was forced to flee. He went to the court of Persian King Xerxes I, who gave him the cities of Teuthrania and Halisarna, around Pergamum, where his descendants Eurysthenes and Procles still ruled in the early 4th century BC.

Demaratus accompanied Xerxes I on his invasion of Greece in 480 BC and is alleged to have warned Xerxes not to underestimate the Spartans before the Battle of Thermopylae:

Xerxes also asked Demaratus about his knowledge of the Greeks and if they would put up a fight against the Persian army. In response, Demaratus spoke favourably about the Greeks even after he had been deposed and exiled from Sparta:

Greek exiles in Achaemenid Empire
Demaratus was one of several Greeks aristocrats who took refuge in the Achaemenid Empire after reversals at home. Other famous cases were Themistocles and Gongylos. In general, they were generously rewarded by the Achaemenid kings, received land grants to support them and ruled over various cities in Asia Minor.

Demaratus's family continued to flourish in Asia as subjects of the Persians, and several of his descendants have been identified. One of them was likely Demaratus, the son of Gorgion, who was restored to Sparta in the early 3rd century BC and was in turn the putative great-grandfather of Nabis, the last king of Sparta (ruled 207–192).

See also 
 Kings of Sparta

References

 Xenophon Anabasis, ii. j. 3, vii. 8. 17; Hellenica, iii. I. 6
 Athenaeus i. 29 f 
 Herodotus v. 75, vi. 50–70, vii ;
 Pausanias iii. 4, 3–5, 7, 7–8; 
 Diodorus xi. 6; 
 Polyaenus ii. 20; 
 Seneca the Younger, De benefici-is, Vi. 31, 4–12

Bibliography 
 Paul Cartledge & Antony Spawforth, Hellenistic and Roman Sparta, A tale of two cities, London and New York, Routledge, 2002 (originally published in 1989). 
Brenda Griffith-Williams, "The Succession to the Spartan Kingship, 520-400 BC", Bulletin of the Institute of Classical Studies, Vol. 54, No. 2 (2011), pp. 43–58".

External links
Demaratus on the Spartan Way of Living
 DEMARATUS – Encyclopaedia Iranica

6th-century BC births
5th-century BC deaths
6th-century BC rulers
5th-century BC rulers
6th-century BC Spartans
5th-century BC Spartans
Eurypontid kings of Sparta
Battle of Thermopylae
Ancient Greek emigrants to the Achaemenid Empire
Year of birth unknown
People of the Greco-Persian Wars
Military personnel of the Achaemenid Empire
Rulers in the Achaemenid Empire